Xhepa is an Albanian surname. Notable people with the surname include:

Margarita Xhepa (born 1932), Albanian actress
Ndriçim Xhepa (born 1957), Albanian actor
Selami Xhepa, Albanian politician

Albanian-language surnames